{{safesubst:#invoke:RfD||2=Tuyet|month = March
|day = 11
|year = 2023
|time = 15:11
|timestamp = 20230311151100

|content=
REDIRECT TOA

}}